Anomaloglossus stepheni (common name: Stephen's rocket frog) is a species of frog in the family Aromobatidae. It is found in French Guiana and adjacent Suriname and Brazil.

Description
Colostethus stepheni is a small frog. Its general colour is some shade of brown and it has a dark stripe running down either side extending about half way along the body. There are bluish-white specks below this and on the toes. The male has a white or grey vocal sac and the female a pale throat.

Distribution
Colostethus stepheni occurs in French Guiana and adjacent Suriname as well as in the Amazon rainforest of Brazil where it is widespread in the Adolfo Ducke Forest Reserve near the confluence of the Rio Negro and Solimões River.

Biology
Colostethus stepheni is a diurnal, terrestrial species spending its life in forest litter where it forages on invertebrates such as termites, beetles and flies. Breeding takes place in the rainy season. The male finds a suitable location and calls to attract a female. The nesting site is a boat-shaped curled up fallen leaf with another above acting as a roof. The female lays three to six eggs with gelatinous capsules inside the hollow leaf and remains at the nest for about an hour. After that she departs and the male returns and guards the eggs. Further females are encouraged to lay inside the nest which may come to have several developing clutches of eggs of different ages. The developing larvae are not transported to water, as is the case with the related dendrobatids, but complete their development on land. Metamorphosis into juvenile frogs occurs after about 31 days.

Status
Colostethus stepheni is listed as being of "Least Concern" in the IUCN Red List of Threatened Species. It is assumed to have a large population and wide range and the population appears to be stable.

References

stepheni
Amphibians described in 1990
Amphibians of Brazil
Amphibians of French Guiana
Amphibians of Suriname
Taxonomy articles created by Polbot